Inspissation is the process of increasing the viscosity of a fluid, or even of causing it to solidify, typically by dehydration or otherwise reducing its content of solvents. The term also has been applied to coagulation by heating of some substances such as albumens, or cooling some such as solutions of gelatin or agar. Some forms of inspissation may be reversed by re-introducing solvent, such as by adding water to molasses or gum arabic; in other forms, its resistance to flow may include cross-linking or mutual adhesion of its component particles or molecules, in ways that prevent their dissolving again, such as in the irreversible setting or gelling of some kinds of rubber latex, egg-white, adhesives, or coagulation of blood.

Intentional use
Inspissation is the process used when heating high-protein containing media; for example to enable recovery of bacteria for testing. Once inspissation has occurred, any stained bacteria, such as  Mycobacteria, can then be isolated.

A Serum inspissation or Fractional sterilization is a process of heating an article on 3 successive days as follows:

Pathologic inspissation
In cystic fibrosis, inspissation of secretions in the respiratory and gastrointestinal tracts is a major mechanism of causing the disease.

References

Further reading
Textbook of Microbiology by Prof. C P Baveja, 
Textbook of Microbiology by Ananthanarayan and Panikar, 

Microbiology
Zoology